Laron or LaRon is a given name. Notable people with the given name include:

LaRon Byrd (born 1989), American football player
LaRon Landry (born 1984), American football player
Laron Profit (born 1977), American basketball player and coach
Laron Scott (born 1987), American football player